The Stinson SM-6000 Airliner was a 1930s three-engined (trimotor) ten-passenger airliner designed and built by the Stinson Aircraft Corporation. The SM-6000 was a high-wing braced monoplane with room for a pilot and a cabin for ten passengers. It was powered by three 215 hp (160 kW) Lycoming R-680 engines strut-mounted one each side above the main landing gear units and one in the nose. A number of variants were built mainly with improved interiors. In 1932 the Model U Airliner was produced which had low-set stub wings with an engine mounted at each wingtip.

Variants
Corman 6000
The initial prototypes produced by the Corman aircraft Co. as part of the E L Cord empire.
SM-6000 Airliner
1930 initial production variant with three 215hp (160kW) Lycoming R-680 engines.
SM-6000-A Airliner
1930 variant available with different interior configurations.

SM-6000-B1 Airliner
1931 all-passenger variant with better interior equipment.
SM-6000-B2 Airliner
As the B1 but with a mixed mail/passenger interior.
Model U Airliner
1932 improved model with three 240hp (179kW) Lycoming R-680-BA engines on stub wings.
C-91
United States military designation for one SM-6000-A (s/n 42-79547) impressed into service in 1942.

Survivors
Only two of these high-wing models are known to exist.  One is owned and operated by Mid America Flight Museum in Mount Pleasant, TX, the other by Kermit Weeks and is maintained in airworthy condition at Fantasy of Flight in Polk City, Florida.

Operators

American Airways
Boston-Maine Central Vermont Airways
Century Airlines
Chesapeake Airways
Chicago and Southern Airlines
Delta Air Lines
National Airlines System
New York, Philadelphia and Washington Airway Corporation aka Ludington Airline
Rapid Air Lines

INAEC Iloilo Negros Air Express Company

Specifications (SM-6000-B)

Notes

References

External links

1930s United States airliners
Airliner
Trimotors
High-wing aircraft